Naem (also referred to as nham, naem moo, som moo, naem maw, chin som) is a pork sausage in Laos and Thai. It is a fermented food that has a sour flavor. It has a short shelf life, and is often eaten in raw form after the fermentation process has occurred. It is a popular Southeast Asian food, and different regions of Southeast Asia have various preferred flavors, including variations of sour and spicy. Naem is used as an ingredient in various dishes and is also served as a side dish.

Naem contains 185 kilocalories per  and contains a significant amount of protein, a moderate amount of fat, and minor carbohydrate content. Parasites and enteropathogenic bacteria have been found in samples of naem. Lactic acid formed during its fermentation inhibits the growth of Salmonella. Lactobacillus curvatus use in the product has been proven to prevent the growth of pathogenic bacteria in naem. It is sometimes irradiated. The bacterial content in Thai sour pork products is regulated.

Overview
Naem is a red-colored, semi-dry lactic-fermented pork sausage in Southeast Asian cuisine prepared using minced raw pork and pork skin, significant amounts of cooked sticky rice, chili peppers, garlic, sugar, salt and potassium nitrate.  Minced beef is sometimes used in its preparation. After the mix is prepared, it is encased in banana leaves, synthetic sausage casings or tubular plastic bags and left to ferment for three to five days. Naem has a sour quality to it due to the fermentation, in which lactic acid bacteria and yeasts grow within the sausage. The lactic acid bacteria and yeasts expand by feeding upon the rice and sugar, and the use of salt prevents the meat from rotting.

Naem typically has a short shelf life, which can be extended through refrigeration. The sausage can be time-consuming and labor-intensive to prepare. It is typically stored at room temperature, which gives it a shelf life of around one week. It is produced all over Southeast Asia in slight variations.

Naem is often consumed raw, (after fermentation has occurred), and is often accompanied with shallot, ginger, bird's eye chili peppers and spring onions. It is used as an ingredient in various dishes such as naem fried with eggs, Naem khao and Naem phat wun sen sai khai, and is also consumed as a side dish and as a condiment. The cooking of naem significantly changes its flavor.

Prominence
Naem has been described in Thailand as "one of the popular meat products of the country prepared from ground pork" and as "one of the most popular traditional Thai fermented meat products".

Varieties

Different regions of Thailand have different preferred flavors: northern and northeastern pork is a little bit sour, central is sour, and southern is spicy. Naem mo in northern Thailand may be fermented in a clay pot.

Use in dishes
Dishes prepared with naem include naem fried with eggs, and naem fried rice. Naem phat wun sen sai khai is a dish prepared with naem, glass noodles and eggs, among other ingredients such as spring onions and red pepper. Nam Khao is a salad dish in Lao cuisine prepared using Lao fermented pork sausage, rice, coconut, peanuts, mint, cilantro, fish sauce, and lemon juice. Naem and rice are formed into balls, deep-fried, and then served broken atop the various ingredients. Serenade, a restaurant in Bangkok, makes a dish called the "McNaem", which consists of a duck egg wrapped in naem that is fried and then served with risotto, slaw, shiitake mushrooms, herbs, and cooked sea scallops atop crushed garlic.

There are many applications of sour pork with different flavors such as phat phet naem, tom kha naem, ho mok naem, and naem priao wan.

Nutritional content

According to the "Industrialization of Thai Nham" by Warawut Krusong of the King Mongkut's Institute of Technology Ladkrabang vitamins B1 and B2, ferric iron, and phosphorus were present in naem, quantities unspecified.

Microbiology
Naem has on occasion been contaminated with parasites such as Taenia solium, Trichinella spiralis, and enteropathogenic bacteria such as coliform bacteria and Salmonella. It has been demonstrated that Salmonella growth is inhibited by the formation of lactic acid during the fermentation process. Use of the starter culture Lactobacillus curvatus has been shown to prevent "the outgrowth of pathogenic bacteria" in naem. Naem is sometimes irradiated.

Regulations on bacterial content 
The bacterial content in Thai sour pork products is regulated. Bacteria at higher levels may cause sickness.

See also

 List of fermented foods
 List of sausages
 Sai krok Isan – a fermented sausage originating in the northeastern provinces of Thailand
 Sai ua – a grilled pork sausage from northern Thailand and northeastern Burma
 Nem chua

References

Bibliography

Further reading

 

Thai sausages